Ambruse Vanzekin (born 14 July 1986) is a former Nigerian football goalkeeper who played primarily for Warri Wolves F.C. He is from Uokha in Owan east local government of Edo State.

Career
Vanzekin began his career with Plateau United before scouted to Bendel Insurance F.C. in 2006. He left Insurance in January 2008 and moved to Akwa United F.C. until they were relegated after the 2008–09 season. Vanzekin left his club Akwa United F.C. in July 2009 to sign for Warri Wolves.

International
He was a member of the silver medalist Nigeria U-23 team at the 2008 Summer Olympics and formerly a member of both the U-17 team at 2003 FIFA U-17 World Championship and the U-20 team at 2005 FIFA World Youth Championship, where they were runners-up.

Honors
 FIFA U-20 World Cup runner-up: 2005
 Summer Olympics runner-up: 2008

References

1986 births
Living people
Nigerian footballers
Footballers at the 2008 Summer Olympics
Nigeria under-20 international footballers
Akwa United F.C. players
Olympic footballers of Nigeria
Bendel Insurance F.C. players
Olympic silver medalists for Nigeria
Plateau United F.C. players
Warri Wolves F.C. players
Pepsi Football Academy players
Olympic medalists in football
Medalists at the 2008 Summer Olympics
Association football goalkeepers